Green Charge Networks, LLC is an energy storage company based in Santa Clara, California, that goes by the name Green Charge. Founded in 2009, Green Charge helps businesses and institutions reduce peak demand charges through the use of a combination of predictive software and battery hardware the company calls "power efficiency".

Energy storage projects
The first pilot GreenStation intelligent demand reduction system was installed in July 2011 at a 7-Eleven in New York. Triple Pundit notes that the success of that first pilot project to "reduce grid demand, boost power efficiency, and deliver savings month after month has driven GCN’s rapid transition from pilot stage to commercial scale." The first GreenStation garnered some attention when it survived Hurricane Sandy and then saved the 7-Eleven store 56 percent on their utility bills during New York's 2013 summer heat wave.
In March 2014, Green Charge announced that it had signed 1.5 MW of energy storage projects with high-profile clients including 7-Eleven, Avis, Walgreens and others. The company has set a goal of completing 5 MW by the end of 2014.

Power efficiency
Green Charge claims to be the first company to offer Power Efficiency Leases. Similar to the way that solar leases helped solar become mainstream by allowing more homeowners to go solar with zero money down, Green Charge aims to help more businesses utilize energy storage by offering systems at zero upfront cost.
The idea of power efficiency builds off the difference between energy (kWh) and power (kW). Energy efficiency focuses on reducing the amount of energy consumed while power efficiency focuses on reducing the rate at which energy is used, also known as peak demand.

Funding
Green Charge received $12 million in a grant from the United States Department of Energy in 2011. The company received further funding from angel investor Richard Lowenthal, founder and CTO of car charging network ChargePoint, in December 2013.

In March 2014, Green Charge received $10 million in financing from TIP Capital to finance energy storage projects for their customers with zero upfront cost.

In July 2014, Green Charge secured $56 million in capital from K Road DG, a distributed energy and smart grid solution company.

In May 2016, Engie acquired an 80 percent stake in Green Charge. A day later, Exergonix, Inc. acquired rival Coda Energy.

References

Energy storage
Technology companies based in the San Francisco Bay Area
Companies based in Santa Clara, California
Renewable resource companies established in 2009
2009 establishments in California
American companies established in 2009